not to be confused with Beaupré Abbey (Lorraine) or the nunnery of Beaupré Abbey (Nord)

Beaupré Abbey is a former Cistercian monastery in the commune of Achy, department of Oise and region of Picardy, France. Its site is located about 2 km south-east of Marseille-en-Beauvaisis, on the Petit-Thérain brook.

History 
The monastery was founded in 1135 on lands given by the seigneurs of Milly and settled by monks from Ourscamp Abbey, its motherhouse, of the filiation of Clairvaux.

The abbey owned granges at Caurroy, Brombos and Briot-la-Grange, the farms of Woimaison and Ovillers and the wood of Malmifait.

In 1346 it was destroyed during the Hundred Years' War by Edward III, King of England.

It is not easy to determine exactly when it was dissolved - probably during the French Revolution, and possibly in 1791. In the 19th century the buildings were used as a cotton mill and later sold for demolition.

Buildings and site 
The church has mostly disappeared. Still in existence are the refectory of the guest wing, the main gateway and parts of the precinct wall, as well as the ruins of the abbey mill.

References 
 Peugniez, Bernard, nd: Routier cistercien (2nd ed), p. 372. Moisenay: Editions Gaud

External links 
 Cistercensi: Beaupré

Cistercian monasteries in France
Christian monasteries established in the 12th century
1135 establishments in Europe
1130s establishments in France
Monasteries in Oise
Monasteries destroyed during the French Revolution